Extended Movement is a promotional extended play, released by trance DJ BT during his Movement in Still Life era. It was released only at college campuses in the United States, prior to the release of Movement in Still Life. It contains two unmixed songs, "The Hip Hop Phenomenon" and "Fibonacci Sequence", which could not be found on the U.S. release of Movement in Still Life (The latter could not be found on the U.K. version either). It also contains remixes of three songs off of Movement in Still Life: "Never Gonna Come Back Down", "Mercury and Solace" and "Godspeed". Every normal, unmixed song on this extended play were eventually  released individually as singles themselves.

Track listing

References

2000 EPs
BT (musician) EPs